Gahagan is a surname of which is derived from Geoghegan. Notable people with the surname include: 

 Dennis Gahagan (c. 1817–?), early settler in San Diego, California
 Helen Gahagan Douglas (1900–1980), American actress and politician
 James Gahagan (1927–1999), American painter
 John Gahagan (born 1958), Scottish footballer
 Lawrence Gahagan (d.1820), Irish-born sculptor
 Sebastian Gahagan (1779–1838), Irish-born sculptor

See also
 Gahagan Mounds Site, a Caddoan Mississippian culture mound site in Red River Parish, Louisiana, US
 Geoghegan, the surname which Gahagan derives from